The 1984 North Carolina gubernatorial election was held on November 6, 1984. Democratic incumbent Jim Hunt was unable to run for another consecutive term under the North Carolina Constitution. Hunt ran instead for the U.S. Senate against Jesse Helms and lost, although he later announced his campaign for a third gubernatorial term in the 1992 election. Popular 9th District Congressman James G. Martin ran as the Republican nominee against Democratic Attorney General Rufus L. Edmisten, who defeated Hunt's Lt. Governor, James Green, among other candidates, in a hotly contested primary.

Martin won by a comfortable margin on Election Day thanks to the surprise endorsement of Green, and to President Ronald Reagan's coattails (see also 1984 United States presidential election). Martin became just the second Republican elected to the state's highest office in the 20th century.

An offhand remark by Edmisten during the 1984 campaign became part of the state's political lore. He was quoted as complaining about all the barbecue pork he had to eat on the campaign trail, saying he could not eat anymore of "that damnable stuff", which is widely popular.
 Edmisten later said he was joking.

Primary election results

Democratic primary

Republican primary

General election results

Footnotes

North Carolina
1984
Gubernatorial